The NAB AFL Women's Under-18 Championships are the annual national Australian rules football championships for women players aged 18 years or younger. The competition is seen as one of the main pathways towards being drafted into a team in the professional AFL Women's competition (AFLW). Originally known as the AFL Youth Girls National Championship, the competition has teams of players representing their states and territories in a round robin tournament. The tournament is currently sponsored by the National Australia Bank. The winner of the 2019 tournament was Vic Metro.

History
A 2008 series between the Queensland and Victoria teams was the predecessor to a national state-based competition for young female footballers. The inaugural competition was conducted in September 2010, in Craigieburn, Victoria. Six teams competed: Western Australia, South Australia, Queensland, a combined New South Wales and Australian Capital Territory side (NSW/ACT), and two Victorian squads. These were divided into two pools—first: an AFL Victoria Development squad combined with an East section, which consisted of NSW/ACT and Queensland players; and West, made up of players from South Australia, Western Australia, and Victoria. Teams played three regular games against the sides from the opposite pool before a finals series.

Several team changes occurred in 2012 and 2013. In 2012, the Victorian team was split into Victoria Metro and Victoria Country. A combined Northern Territory–Tasmania team known as the Thunder Devils and an Indigenous Australian side called the Woomeras entered the tournament in 2014. In 2021 the Woomeras were joined by the Medleys, a multicultural under-17 representative program.

AFL Women's, a national women's league which was inaugurated in 2017, allowed the championships to become a formalised pathway competition to the national league. Consequently the name of the competition was changed to AFL Women's Under 18 Championships, having previously been known as the AFL Under 18 Youth Girls Championships. Changes were also made to tournament structure. The tournament was played over two rounds; in the first round, South Australia, Tasmania and the Northern Territory played in a separate division. The best players from the states combined to form an Allies team, which competed in the second round against the other states (the Woomeras did not compete). In 2018, a similar Eastern Allies team was established (made up of NSW/ACT and Tasmania players), bringing the total number of teams to 10.

There was no championships staged in 2020 due to the impact of the COVID-19 pandemic, which caused the 2021 tournament to have an increased age eligibility by one year (under-19).

Tournaments 

Source: List of Winners (pp. 4)

See also

AFL Under-19 Championships
AFL Women's National Championship

References

 
Australian rules interstate football
Women's Australian rules football competitions in Australia
2010 establishments in Australia